Florence Fabricant is a food critic and food writer. She has authored multiple cookbooks and has regularly contributed to The New York Times since 1980. Fabricant lives in Manhattan, New York and East Hampton, New York.

Early life 
Fabricant received her undergraduate degree from Smith College. She received an M.A. degree in French from New York University Graduate School of Arts and Sciences in 1962.

Career 
In 1972, Fabricant began her journalistic career, writing for the "In Season" column for The East Hampton Star. That same year, she began contributing to The New York Times. She became a regular Times contributor in 1980. She holds a L'Ordre National du Mérite from the French government.

Volunteer work 
Her works with The Society of MSKCC helped raise money for cancer care, research, and treatment.

Books
In addition to contributing to the restaurant, metro, style and travel sections of the Times, she has published eleven cookbooks: 
Wine with Food: Pairing Notes and Recipes from The New York Times
Park Avenue Potluck
Park Avenue Potluck Celebrations: Entertaining at Home with New York's Savviest Hostesses
The New York Restaurant Cookbook
The Great Potato Book
Venetian Taste
Florence Fabricant's Pleasures of the Table
New Home Cooking
The New York Times Dessert Cookbook
The New York Times Seafood Cookbook
Elizabeth Berry's Great Bean Book (with Elizabeth Berry) 
 
Patricia Fabricant, her daughter, designed five of her books.

References

Critics employed by The New York Times
The New York Times writers
Living people
Year of birth missing (living people)
New York University alumni
American cookbook writers
21st-century American women writers
American critics
American women journalists
Women cookbook writers
American women critics
American food writers
James Beard Foundation Award winners
American women non-fiction writers
Women food writers
20th-century American women writers
21st-century American journalists